The Telugu–Kannada script (or Kannada–Telugu script) was a writing system used in Southern India. Despite some significant differences, the scripts used for the Kannada and Telugu languages remain quite similar and highly mutually intelligible.

History
The Dravidian family comprises about 73 languages including Tamil, Kannada, Telugu and Malayalam.  Satavahanas introduced the Brahmi to present-day Telugu and Kannada speaking regions. Bhattiprolu script introduced by the Satavahanas gave rise to the Kadamba script. During the 5th to 7th centuries the early Bādāmi Chālukyās and Early Banavasi Kadambās used an early form of the Kannada script in inscriptions, called the Kadamba script. The Kadamba script evolved into the Kannada script. When Chalukya empire extended towards Telugu speaking regions they established another branch in Vengi, namely the Eastern Chalukyas or the Chalukyas of Vengi who later introduced Kannada script to Telugu language which developed Kannada-Telugu script. which was used between the 7th and 11th centuries CE.

Kannada became a written language ahead of Telugu. Kannada produced many poetries during the eighth century under Chalukyas. Full-fledged literary works in Kannada appeared in the ninth century, two centuries later they became available in Telugu. The earliest known Telugu inscriptions date to the 6th century CE. Telugu poetry began to appear in the 11th century. Telugu writers waited until the 11th century because of socio-political factors (royal patronage, the influence of Buddhism and Jainism).

Between 1100 CE and 1400 CE the Kannada and Telugu scripts separated from the Kannada-Telugu script. Satavahanas and Chalukyas influenced the similarities between Kannada and Telugu scripts.

Comparison

The following sections visualize the difference between modern-day Kannada and Telugu styles.

Consonants

There is another legacy consonant ೞ/ఴ (ḻa) used to represent , but currently not in use.

Vowels

Independent vowels

Numerals

Unicode

Although the alphabets for Kannada and Telugu languages could have been encoded under a single Unicode block with language-specific fonts to differentiate the styles, they were encoded separately by the governments due to socio-political reasons. Both the script variants were added to the Unicode Standard in October, 1991 with the release of version 1.0.

See also
 Kannada inscriptions

 
 Linguistic history of the Indian subcontinent
 Pallava script

External links
 Evolution of Telugu Character Graphs
 Salankayana Telugu-Kannada script
 Kadamba -> Old-Kannada -> Kannada and Telugu script
 Copper plates in Telugu-Kannada script
 Brahmi -> Kadamba -> Old Kannada -> Telugu-Kannada scripts

Inscriptions in Kannada-Telugu script 
 Kakatiya period Telugu-Kannada inscription by poet Nrusimha Rushi dating between 1295 and 1325 found on hillocks near Urs on the outskirts of Warangal.
 13th-century Kakatiya era Bayyaram stone inscription found in Bayyaram mandal Andhra Pradesh.

Evolution and Development of Kannada-Telugu script 
 Development of Kannada-Telugu script
 Evolution of Telugu-kannada script
 Kalyana Chalukya Kannada script
 Kannada Script Evolution - Brahmi to Mysore Wadayar Kannada
 Telugu Script Evolution - Brahmi to Vijayanagara script

References

Writing systems
Brahmic scripts